Great World, formerly known as Great World City, is a mixed-used development consisting of a 6-storey shopping mall, two 18-storey office towers and a 35-storey serviced apartment tower in the Central Area of Singapore. Located between Kim Seng and Zion Roads, near River Valley Road and Kim Seng Promenade, it was built on the former site of Great World Amusement Park.

The East Office Tower of Great World houses the Embassy of Kazakhstan on the 9th floor of the building.

History
Great World City was completed in October 1997 as a redevelopment of the former Great World Amusement Park. When it first opened, it had an OG department store (closed in 2003), a Golden Village cinema, a Food Junction food court, a Cold Storage supermarket and more than 130 specialty shops. The Golden Village cinema was the first to include a short-lived IMAX hall and Singapore's first premium cinema concept, Gold Class.

Renovation
In 2018, the mall underwent its first major renovation works in preparation for the opening of Great World MRT station and new developments in the vicinity, which were completed and officially reopened in late 2020. The renovation works include reconfiguring the interior layout, such as having "dual level retail pods" in one of its atriums, and widening the walkways to improve accessibility. 

Food Junction was relocated to Level 3, taking up a portion of Amazonia's former space. Amazonia, an indoor playground for kids, also revamped during this period and reopened in Dec 2019. Japanese supermarket chain Meidi-Ya opened in Basement 2, to complement the existing Cold Storage supermarket in 2019. The mall remained open throughout the renovation works.

Great World MRT station opened on 13 November 2022, giving the mall close access to an MRT station.

See also
 List of shopping malls in Singapore
 List of restaurants in Singapore

References

External links

Shopping malls in Singapore
Singapore River
1997 establishments in Singapore